Meso Gerakari is a village in the municipal unit of Alykes on the island Zakynthos, Greece. According to a 2001 census, Meso Gerakari contained approximately 402 inhabitants.

References 

Populated places in Zakynthos